"Big Amount" is a hip hop song by American rapper 2 Chainz. It was released as the first single from his mixtape Daniel Son; Necklace Don. The song features vocals from Canadian rapper Drake, and was produced by Buddah Bless. It is also included as a bonus track as the eighth track on digital versions of Pretty Girls Like Trap Music.

Charts

Certifications

References

2016 singles
2016 songs
2 Chainz songs
Drake (musician) songs
Songs written by 2 Chainz
Songs written by Drake (musician)
Songs written by Buddah Bless
Song recordings produced by Buddah Bless
Def Jam Recordings singles